Duke of Sparta (Katharevousa: , Demotic Greek: Δούκας της Σπάρτης) was a title instituted in 1868 to designate the Crown Prince of the Kingdom of Greece. Its legal status was exceptional, as the Constitution of Greece forbade the award or acceptance of titles of nobility for Greek citizens. Consequently, it was mostly used abroad, and only occasionally and unofficially within Greece.

The birth of Crown Prince Constantine (later king as Constantine I) on 21 July/2 August 1868 was widely celebrated in Greece, especially as the heir-apparent's name resonated with the Byzantine imperial tradition and the irredentist aspirations enshrined in the "Megali Idea". As a result, on the day of the Crown Prince's baptism on 22 August/3 September, at the initiative of the Prime Minister Dimitrios Voulgaris, his father, King George I, issued a decree according to which Constantine, as well as any future heir to the Greek crown, would bear the title "Duke of Sparta". However, this decree was contrary to Article 3 of the Greek constitution, which expressly prohibited the recognition of foreign titles of nobility or the conferment of such on Greek citizens, a tradition that had been established already during the Greek War of Independence, even though several of its leading figures had previously borne such titles.

This led to a stormy debate in Parliament, at the instigation of Timoleon Filimon. The government of the day backed the decree on the argument that the constitutional provision did not apply to members of the Royal Family, but Filimon and others countered that the phrasing made no distinction, and that the decree thus violated the constitution.

The decree was finally approved by Parliament on 17/29 September 1868, with 98 votes in favour, 2 abstentions, and 26 against. Nevertheless, use of the title "Duke of Sparta" within Greece was later quietly dropped. However, Crown Prince Constantine was known as "HRH The Duke of Sparta" on the international scene from his birth until his accession in 1913—for 45 years.

This again led to the misunderstanding of various, quite respectable publications that the title "Duke of Sparta" was synonymous with that of "Crown Prince of Greece", and the title has thus re-surfaced from time to time, but neither of the successive Crown Princes of Greece have ever been officially styled thus. The term Diadochos (literally, "heir"), which is a functional description and does not have any connotations of a title of nobility, has been historically employed to denote the position of heir-apparent in general—not limited to the Greek throne—instead.

See also
 List of heirs to the Greek throne

References

Greece
Sparta
1868 establishments in Greece
Constantine I of Greece